The United Kingdom Environmental Law Association (UKELA) is a charity registered in England, founded in 1987 and dedicated to improving environmental law in the United Kingdom; its implementation; understanding and awareness of the subject, and networking among lawyers and non-lawyers with an interest in the area.

UKELA, which uses the slogan, "Making the law work for a better environment", organises conferences, lectures and seminars, and work with the UK Parliament on changes to their area of the law. They also publish e-law, a bi-monthly electronic journal for members, as well as various reports and consultation documents.

The organisation, which is run by a council of around 20 individuals including five members of the executive committee, also includes regional groups and working parties on specific aspects of environmental law, and a total of about 800 members.

See also
Environmental Law Foundation

External links
 UK Environmental Law Association

1987 establishments in the United Kingdom
Environmental organisations based in the United Kingdom
Legal organisations based in the United Kingdom
Environmental law in the United Kingdom
Charities based in London